Eklöf is a Nordic surname. Notable people with the surname include:

Linus Eklöf (born 1989), Swedish motorcycle speedway rider
Nils Eklöf (1904–1987), Swedish runner
Patrik Eklöf, Swedish footballer
Verner Eklöf (1897–1955), Finnish footballer

Surnames of Scandinavian origin